The Joyous Liar is a 1919 American silent comedy film directed by Ernest C. Warde and starring J. Warren Kerrigan, Lillian Walker, and Joseph J. Dowling.

Cast
 J. Warren Kerrigan as Burke Harlan 
 Lillian Walker as Anne Warren 
 Joseph J. Dowling as Wilbur Warren 
 Albert R. Cody as James Roth
 Pell Trenton as Jimmy MacDonald 
 Alfred Hollingsworth as James MacDonald

References

Bibliography
 John Flowers and Paul Frizler. Psychotherapists on Film, 1899-1999: A Worldwide Guide to Over 5000 Films, Volume 1. McFarland, 2004.

External links

1919 films
1919 comedy films
Silent American comedy films
Films directed by Ernest C. Warde
American silent feature films
1910s English-language films
Pathé Exchange films
American black-and-white films
Films distributed by W. W. Hodkinson Corporation
1910s American films